Richard Lemon Owings (1812–1902), more commonly known as "Richard Owens" or "Dick Owens", was a pioneer of the American West who played an important role in John C. Fremont's third expedition to the Great Basin and California.  He is best known as a frequent companion and close friend of Kit Carson.  The Owens Valley, Owens River, and Owens Lake in eastern California were all named after him by Fremont, even though Owings apparently never visited any of them.

Biography
Owings was born in Owings Mills, Maryland, and grew up near Zanesville, Ohio before going west in 1834 with Caleb Wilkins. His adventures with Carson and Fremont took place in the years between then and 1850.  Around 1850 he returned to his family near Marion, Indiana, and in 1854 married Emily Miller.  He moved to Iowa during the Civil War and then to Circleville, Kansas in 1872, living there until he died in 1902. He and Emily had four sons, three of whom survived him.

In 1839 Owings spent three months trapping beaver with Carson in South Dakota. The two became close friends and were frequent companions over the following decade.  Carson and other "mountain men" invariably called Owings by the name "Dick Owens". Carson and Owings both spent most of the early 1840s living near Taos, New Mexico, and in March 1845 the two started a joint farming venture fifty miles away in Rayado.  When they learned, however, that Fremont was preparing a third expedition to the Great Basin and California, they sold everything at a loss and moved to join Fremont's company.  (Carson had served Fremont as a guide on his earlier expeditions and was highly trusted by him.)  The expedition traveled across the Utah desert to Oregon and spent some time there before moving south along the eastern flank of the Cascade Range and Sierra Nevada.  In the vicinity of Truckee a small group broke off, including Fremont, Carson, and Owens, and crossed the Sierra Nevada range, arriving eventually in Sacramento.  Meanwhile, the majority of the group continued southward, traveling through the area that Fremont would later name Owens Valley, not crossing the mountains until they reached Walker Pass.  Thus Owings did not actually see the river, valley, and lake that Fremont would later name after him.

References

1812 births
1902 deaths
Explorers of California
People from Owings Mills, Maryland